Abdelhafid Metalsi (born 1969) is a Kabyle actor of Algerian ethnicity, who lives in France and was naturalized as French. He is best known for his starring role as the dedicated Capitaine Kader Chérif in the French police series Cherif.

Life and career 
Born in Algeria in 1969, Abdelhafid Metalsi moved to France at age one, in Champagne province, where he grew up. He lived in the Orgeval district in Reims for part of his childhood. He began training as an actor at the Chaillot National Theater which gave him the chance to work on stage and act in television shows such as Spiral season 4 (Canal+) or Spin (France 2). Metalsi is especially known for his role as captain Kader Chérif, the lead character in the cop show Cherif which has been broadcast on the France 2 network until 2019.

Filmography 
 2000 : L'Electron libre
 2003 : Hymne à la gazelle, (short film)
 2005 : Zim and Co.
 2005 : Nuit noire, 17 octobre 1961, (TV film)
 2005 : Groupe flag, (TV series)
 2005 : Le Tigre et la Neige
 2005 : Munich
 2006 : En el hoyo, (short film)
 2006 : La Jungle
 2006 : Pour l'amour de Dieu, (TV film)
 2006 : Femmes de loi, (TV series)
 2006 : Mauvaise Foi
 2006 : Mafiosa, le clan, (TV series)
 2007 : Tout est bon dans le cochon, (short film)
 2007 : Michou d'Auber
 2007 : L'Ennemi intime
 2007 : Andalucia
 2007 : L'Affaire Ben Barka, (TV film)
 2007 : La Commune, (TV series)
 2008 : Un roman policier
 2008 : Terre de lumière, (TV series)
 2008 : L'Instinct de mort 
 2008 : Un si beau voyage
 2008 : Versailles
 2009 : Le choix de Myriam, (TV film)
 2009 : Adieu Gary
 2009 : Le Siffleur
 2010 : Alice Nevers, le juge est une femme, (TV series)
 2010 : Des hommes et des dieux
 2010 : Les Mains libres
 2010 : The Assault
 2011 : L'Exercice de l'État
 2011 : Une nouvelle vie
 2012 : Il était une fois, une fois
 2012 : Spin (Les Hommes de l'ombre) (TV servies)
 2012 : L'Affaire Gordji : Histoire d'une cohabitation, (TV film)
 2012 : Engrenages, (TV series)
 2012 : Au nom d'Athènes, (TV film)
 2013 : Les Invincibles
 2013 : Cherif, (TV series)

Theatre 
 Femmes fatales on the subject of Sénèque and Shakespeare, directed by Élisabeth Chailloux, Théâtre des Quartiers d’Ivry
 La vie qui va, directed by Yves Guerre, Compagnie Arc-en-Ciel
 Le point de vue de la vache sacrée by Sholby, directed by Alexis Monceaux
 Andromaque by Jean Racine, directed by Abdelhafid Metalsi

Awards and nominations 
 Festival Séries Mania : the 2013 best actor in a French television series for Cherif.

References 

20th-century French male actors
Living people
1973 births
21st-century French male actors
French male television actors
French male stage actors
Date of birth missing (living people)

External Links